Mainville may refer to:

Mainville (surname)
Mainville, Pennsylvania, a census-designated place in Columbia County, Pennsylvania, United States
Mairy-Mainville, a commune in Meurthe-et-Moselle department, France